Copelatus ponomarenkoi is a species of diving beetle. It is part of the genus Copelatus in the subfamily Copelatinae of the family Dytiscidae. It was described by Riha in 1974.

References

ponomarenkoi
Beetles described in 1974